The William Waring Property is a historic building in Savannah, Georgia, United States. Located in the northwestern residential block of Wright Square, at 12 West State Street, it dates to 1825, making it the oldest extant building on the square. It was built for Dr. William R. Waring, a prominent Savannah physician.

In a survey for the Historic Savannah Foundation, Mary Lane Morrison found the building to be of significant status.

See also 
 Buildings in Savannah Historic District

References 

Houses in Savannah, Georgia
Houses completed in 1825
Savannah Historic District

Wright Square (Savannah) buildings